May I Bring a Friend? is a 1964 book by Beatrice Schenk de Regniers. Published by Atheneum Books for Young Readers, It tells the story of a well-mannered boy who frequently gets invited to visit the king and queen. The first time he goes, he asks if he can bring a friend the next time he visits. When they say yes, he always brings different types of exotic animals who are also well mannered. The illustrator, Sir Beni Montresor, won the Caldecott Medal for the book for his jewel-like illustrations.

References

1964 children's books
Caldecott Medal–winning works
Children's fiction books
American picture books
Atheneum Books books